Živko Anočić (born 13 May 1981) is a Croatian actor. He appeared in more than fifteen films since 2005.

Filmography

Film

Voice acting

References

External links 

1981 births
Living people
People from Osijek
Croatian male film actors